Ram Ratan Ram (1921–2002) was an Indian politician. He was a Member of Parliament and former General Secretary, Indian National Congress. He served as social worker and advocate, under the mentorship of Bose. He was elected to the Bihar Vidhan Sabha in 1952 and won every consecutive election till his move to the centre in 1984. Ram was elected to the Lok Sabha, the lower house of the Parliament of India from  Hajipur in Bihar as a member of the Indian National Congress.

He was a prominent member of the Indian National Congress post independence. Mr. Ram Ratan Ram also served as the Chairman of the SC/ST Commission of India and was also one of the pioneers in the formation of the state of Jharkhand.

At a state level politician in Bihar, he held several portfolios during the years before his Lok Sabha term, most notably as Minister for Animal and Fish Resources Department in the Government of Bihar.

Early and personal life 
Sri Ram was B.A., LL.B., affiliated with [Congress (I)—Bihar, Hajipur  (Res. Sch. Castes), 1984]  s. of late Shri Laxman Ram; b. at Ranchi, March 24, 1921; early education at Nibaran Ashram started by  Mahatma Gandhi, B. K. High School, Ranchi College, Doranda College, Chotanagpur Law College, Ranchi University, Bihar;

Married to Smt. Bina Devi, April 29, 1942; they had 8 sons and daughter.

He spent most of his time between New Delhi, Ranchi and Patna. On 16 August 2002 he was admitted to Escorts Heart Institute under Dr. Naresh Trehan due to a heart attack and passed away on the 20th August 2002.

Political career 
In his early years, he was a part of the freedom movement as he went on to complete his education in law subsequently working as an advocate, political and social worker, participated in 1942 Movement.

He was Cabinet Minister, Government of Bihar, 1974–77; Member, (i) All India Congress Committee and (ii) Bihar Pradesh Congress Committee; President, Ranchi District Congress Committee; Secretary, (i) Backward Classes Federation, 1952–64, (ii) Depressed Classes League, Bihar, 1952–72; and (iii) Ranchi Nagar Charmodyog Sahakari  Samiti Limited, 1955–80; chairman, (i) Jagannath Mandir Trust, 1975–85, (ii) Bihar State Leather Industries Development Corporation, 1984–85, (iii) Scheduled Castes Parishad, Bihar and (iv) East Bengal Refugees Association; present chairman, Shaheed Smarak Samiti, Ranchi; General Secretary, D.C.L., Bihar; Member, (i) Railway Consultative Committee, South, Eastern Railway, 1953–62, (ii) Transport Authority, Ranchi, 1953–62, (iii) Bihar State Scheduled Castes Advisory Board, 1952–85 and (iv) Forest Advisory Board, Bihar, 1952–62 and had been member of several Development Committees of State Government in Ranchi District; Member, (i) Bihar Vidhan Sabha, 1952–62, 1972–77, 1980–84 and (ii) Bihar Vidhan Parishad, 1964–70.

References

External links
Official biographical sketch in Lok Sabha website

Indian National Congress politicians
India MPs 1984–1989
Lok Sabha members from Bihar
1921 births
2002 deaths